Giulio Tonduzzi (c.1513 – c.1583) was an Italian painter of the Renaissance period.

He was born in Faenza, which flourished in the first half of the 16th century. He was a pupil of Giulio Romano. He painted a Stoning of S. Stephen for the church in Faenza.
He also worked in Ravenna.

References

1583 deaths
1513 births
Italian Renaissance painters
16th-century Italian painters
Italian male painters
People from Faenza